Snowball effect is a figurative term.

Snowball effect may also refer to:
 Snowball Effect, an equity crowdfunding platform in New Zealand
 "Snowball Effect", a SpongeBob SquarePants episode from season three
 Snowball Effect ISP, an Internet service provider in South Africa